Tom Jones (born 12 November 1956) is a Canadian former volleyball player. He competed in the men's tournament at the 1984 Summer Olympics.

References

External links
 

1956 births
Living people
Canadian men's volleyball players
Olympic volleyball players of Canada
Volleyball players at the 1984 Summer Olympics
Sportspeople from New Westminster
Pan American Games medalists in volleyball
Pan American Games bronze medalists for Canada
Medalists at the 1979 Pan American Games